Mimino is a 1977 comedy film by Soviet director Georgiy Daneliya produced by Mosfilm and Gruziya-film, starring Vakhtang Kikabidze and Frunzik Mkrtchyan. Anatoliy Petritskiy served as the film's Director of Photography.  The Soviet era comedy won the 1977 Golden Prize at the 10th Moscow International Film Festival.

Plot
Georgian bush pilot Valiko Mizandari a.k.a. Mimino (Vakhtang Kikabidze) works at small local airline, flying helicopters between small villages. But he starts to dreams of piloting large international airliners, when he meets his former flight academy classmate accompanied by pretty stewardess Larisa, whom he wishes to impress, assured that bush pilot doesnt have a single chance. So he decides to go to Moscow to follow his dream. There in a hotel he meets Armenian truck driver Ruben Khachikyan (Frunzik Mkrtchyan) who is given a place in that hotel by mistake instead of another Khachikyan (Professor), and they have many adventures in Moscow together.

Always amicable and open to people, Mimino does not feel at home in the Big World. Nevertheless, he becomes a pilot of a supersonic jet liner, the Tupolev Tu-144, flying all over the world, including San Francisco, USA. Feeling homesick, he finally comes back to his native town of Telavi in Georgia, to his family and friends.

Mimino's real name in the film is Valiko Mizandari—his nickname "Mimino" is the Georgian word for sparrow hawk, although it is stated on the back cover of the DVD that "Mimino" means falcon.

Cast
 Vakhtang Kikabidze as Mimino (as Valiko Mizandari)
 Frunzik Mkrtchyan as Rubik (Ruben Khachikyan)
 Elena Proklova as Larisa Ivanovna Komarova
 Yevgeny Leonov as Volokhov
 Kote Daushvili as Grandfather (as Konstantin Daushvili)
 Ruslan Miqaberidze as Givi Ivanovich
 Zakro Sakhvadze as Varlaam
  Leonid Kuravlyov as Professor Khachikyan
 Marina Dyuzheva as Advocate (as Mariya Dyuzheva)
 Rusiko Morchiladze as Lali
 Archil Gomiashvili as Papashvili
  as Prosecutor (as A. Alekseyev)
 Vladimir Basov as Sinitsyn (as V. Basov)
 Valentina Titova as Sinitsyn's Wife (as V. Titova)
  Lyudmila Gavrilova  as symposium organizer
 Nikolay Grabbe as aviation officer, Volokhov's war friend

DVD Extras
The film's cinematographer, Anatoliy Petritskiy, is interviewed about the film.  He reminisces about his experiences working with Daneliya and the actors.  He had known Daneliya for some time and had seen several of his films.  He was very happy to receive the offer to work with him.  Initially the two were working on a different film in 1977, and discussed the doubts they had about the script, after which they decided to work on Mimino as an alternative.  Petritskiy was surprised that Goskino had already approved the film and that funding had been secured, and the project moved forward.  Petritskiy discusses the locations of the various shots in the film, to include various villages in Georgia, the Tbilisi airport, Moscow, and what was then West Germany.  According to Petritskiy, casting the film was not a problem, as Daneliya was familiar with all of the actors in the film.  More strange to the cinematographer, was Daneliya's wish to shoot scenes in the mountainous region Tushetia, because it was a very remote area that could only be reached by helicopter, rather than roads.  Petritskiy described the conditions as "medieval".  He noted that the lack of electricity had "put its stamp of the character of the population of Omalo", which basically lived without light.  He described the society as "patriarchic".  He describes this as the conflict in the film—the conflict between the simple way of life and the way of life in the big city—this is the meaning of the film as he sees it.  It is because of this that he filmed the movie in a very simple style, "a restrained style".  He points out that even the portions of the film shot in Moscow are static shots or simple panoramas.  He considers the landscapes of Georgia in the film to be "extremely beautiful".  Petritskiy then discusses the various shots at airports, which were done as a montage—the helicopter in Tbilisi, and the magnificent TU plane shot in Moscow.  Initially the latter part of the film was to be shot in America, but because of "purely budgetary reasons" according to Petritskiy, the cast and crew could not film there, so opted to shoot in West Berlin.  Thus, the script was revised.  Petritskiy notes that the Soviets were in power during 1977, so it was arranged that the group would stay in East Berlin—again "for economic reasons", and every day had to cross the border to the American zone to film at the Tegel Airport.  As for the scenes with the cow (hanging from the helicopter), it was shot in two stages—a papier-mache dummy of a cow was used with the helicopter for the far off shots, and a live cow was lifted by a crane was used for the close-ups.  He notes that the cow was only hung at a low height, but high enough to use the blue sky as a backdrop, and the cow was not hurt.  Petritskiy did not consider the scene to be difficult, pointing out that the winter scenes were much harder.  He details the harsh living conditions in the village of Darklo where they stayed.  He describes how few locals stay during the winter, and how the living quarters were not guarded or locked, but housed a few shepherds who had stayed back for the winter.  He explains how there were "sleep-benches" within the houses, and how they lived on canned preserves during their stay, sharing their "feast" with the hungry shepherds there.  In conclusion, Petritskiy notes how he "got a very pleasant impression from the work on that film," noting that it was shown at the Moscow International Film Festival and won the top prize there.

Awards
1977 – Golden Prize at the 10th Moscow International Film Festival
1978 – "Golden Lacheno" Award at the 19th IFF in Avellino (Italy)
1978 – Best Comedy Film Award at the 11th All-Union Film Festival in Yerevan
1978 – USSR State Prize (Director G. Daneliya, Actors V. Kikabidze, F. Mkrtchyan)

References

External links

Mimino full-length on YouTube (includes English subtitles)
Monument to “Mimino” Heroes to Be Erected in Moscow

1977 films
1977 comedy films
1977 multilingual films
Mosfilm films
Comedy films from Georgia (country)
1970s Russian-language films
Georgian-language films
Films directed by Georgiy Daneliya
Russian aviation films
Soviet-era films from Georgia (country)
Georgian words and phrases
Soviet multilingual films
Soviet comedy films
Films set in Berlin
Films set in Georgia (country)
Films set in Moscow
Films set in the Soviet Union
Films shot in Georgia (country)
Films shot in Berlin
Films shot in Moscow
Russian comedy films
Films about aviators
Courtroom films
Multilingual films from Georgia (country)